Damian Szpak (born 22 September 1993) is a Polish footballer who most recently played as a forward for Avia Świdnik.

Career
Szpak started his playing career in Sygnał Lublin. In 2011, he joined Motor Lublin, and he made his professional debut on 14 September 2011 in a 1–1 home draw against Garbarnia Kraków, coming on as a substitute in the 73rd minute. In July 2013, he signed four-year contract with Bogdanka Łęczna. Ahead of the 2015/16 season he moved on loan to Orlęta Radzyń Podlaski. He played 30 league games for Orlęta and scored 26 goals for them.

On 23 August 2016, he joined Motor Lublin on a season-long loan. On 11 January 2017, Szpak signed for II liga side Radomiak Radom. On 9 February 2018, he moved to Avia Świdnik. He left the club again at the end of 2018.

On 1 February 2019, Szpak joined Chełmianka Chełm.

References

External links
 

Living people
1993 births
Polish footballers
Motor Lublin players
Górnik Łęczna players
Chełmianka Chełm players
Radomiak Radom players
Avia Świdnik players
I liga players
II liga players
III liga players
Sportspeople from Lublin
Association football forwards